RSVP Movies is an Indian film production company established by Ronnie Screwvala in 2014.

Establishment
In 2017, Ronnie Screwvala re-entered the entertainment business with RSVP after his exit from UTV Motion Pictures in 2013 and produced Love per Square Foot which was digitally released on Netflix in 2018.

Films
Love per Square Foot, starring Vicky Kaushal and Angira Dhar, was the first film produced under RSVP's banner. The film was released on 14 February 2018 and was screened at Beijing International Film Festival 2019.
RSVP produced Lust Stories (2018), an anthology film consisting of four short films from four directors, Anurag Kashyap, Zoya Akhtar, Dibakar Banerjee, and Karan Johar. The film has an ensemble cast including Radhika Apte, Bhumi Pednekar, Kiara Advani, Manisha Koirala, Vicky Kaushal, TejasKrish, and Sanjay Kapoor.

In 2018, RSVP produced Akarsh Khurana's directorial debut Karwaan (2018), starring Irrfan Khan, Dulquer Salmaan and Mithila Palkar. RSVP collaborated with Siddharth Roy Kapur’s Roy Kapur Films for Pihu (2017), which premiered at 2017 International Film Festival of India and screened at the Fajr International Film Festival. The film was released theatrically in November 2018.

RSVP collaborated with Guy in the Sky Pictures and produced Kedarnath (2018) starring Sushant Singh Rajput and Sara Ali Khan. RSVP produced the directorial debut of Aditya Dhar, Uri: The Surgical Strike (2019), starring Vicky Kaushal, Paresh Rawal, Mohit Raina, and Yami Gautam. The film got listed in the top ten Hindi films with the highest domestic net collection and won four National Film Awards including Best Director and Best Actor. In 2019, RSVP produced Sonchiriya, directed by Abhishek Chaubey and starring Sushant Singh Rajput, Bhumi Pednekar, Manoj Bajpayee, Ranvir Shorey and Ashutosh Rana. Vasan Bala's Mard Ko Dard Nahi Hota (2019) starring Abhimanyu Dassani and Radhika Madan was also produced under RSVP's banner. The film premiered at Midnight Madness section of 2018 Toronto International Film Festival and won the People's Choice Award. The film was also screened at 2018 JIO Mumbai Academy of the Moving Image Film Festival.

The Sky Is Pink starring Priyanka Chopra Jonas, Farhan Akhtar, and Zaira Wasim which is going to be premiered at Toronto International Film Festival 2019, Bhangra Paa Le featuring Sunny Kaushal and Raat Akeli Hai starring Nawazuddin Siddiqui, Radhika Apte, and Shweta Tripathi Sharma are some of the acclaimed films. RSVP has also announced three more projects, Natkhat, a short film co-produced with Vidya Balan, Rashmi Rocket, starring Taapsee Pannu and directed by Akarsh Khurana and Sam Bahadur starring Vicky Kaushal and directed by Meghna Gulzar and Tejas starring Kangana Ranaut. In 2021, the company produced its first Telugu film Pitta Kathalu along with  Flying Unicorn Entertainment.

Filmography

References

External links
 Official website

Film production companies based in Mumbai
Indian companies established in 2014
Mass media companies established in 2014
2014 establishments in Maharashtra